Ho-Ho-Kus is a NJ Transit station served by the Bergen County Line and Main Line. The station is located in Ho-Ho-Kus, New Jersey, at Brookside Avenue and 1st Street, across the bridge on Warren Avenue from Franklin Turnpike.

History

The station's current westbound structure was constructed in 1908 with river stones and a tile roof. This replaced facilities built in 1886 that burned. The first station, built in 1860, had also burned down several years after construction.  The eastbound side was an irregularly shaped waiting shed built in 1909.

Station layout
This station has three tracks, the outer two of which are served by low-level side platforms.

References

External links

Ho-Ho-Kus, New Jersey
Railway stations in Bergen County, New Jersey
NJ Transit Rail Operations stations
Former Erie Railroad stations
Railway stations in the United States opened in 1848
1848 establishments in New Jersey